The Senior Italian Open is a men's professional golf tournament for players aged 50 and above which is part of the European Senior Tour schedule. It was played from 2004 to 2008 and then restarted in 2016. The tournament was originally played at GC Venezia, near Venice, but has since been played at GC Arzaga on Lake Garda and GC Udine, Fagagna.

Italy's most successful 20th century male golfer, Costantino Rocca, made his senior debut at the 2007 edition of his home senior open.

Winners

Notes

References

External links
Coverage on the European Senior Tour's official site

European Senior Tour events
Golf tournaments in Italy
Recurring sporting events established in 2004
2004 establishments in Italy